Ricardo Rocha may refer to:

Ricardo Rocha (footballer, born 1962), Brazilian former football defender and coach
Ricardo Rocha (footballer, born 1965), Brazilian former football midfielder and coach
Ricardo Rocha (footballer, born 1978), Portuguese former football defender
Ricardo Rocha (footballer, born 1982), Portuguese former football defender
Ricardo Rocha (footballer, born 1986), Mexican football forward
Ricardo Rodríguez Rocha (born 1962), Mexican politician